This is a list of issue covers of TV Guide magazine from the decade of the 2010s, from January 2010 to December 2019.  This list reflects only the regular weekly or bi-weekly issues of TV Guide (no one-time-only issues), and includes covers that are national or regional in nature, along with any covers that were available exclusively to print or digital subscribers.  The entries on this table include each cover's subjects and their artists (photographer or illustrator).

Dates for two-week "double issues" of the print edition are indicated in bold italics, with listings covering that week and the following week.
Since 2012, TV Guide added a digital edition for subscribers on platforms such as Zinio; these issues, which are downloaded when the printed version's double issues are on their second week, are indicated with dates in italics and with a (D).

2010

2011

2012

2013

2014

2015

2016

2017

2018

2019

References

Sources
Covers and table of contents page descriptions for the various issues
TV Guide magazine website
TV Guide magazine cover archive

Covers
TV Guide covers
TV Guide covers
TV Guide